Zoran Đorđević (born 11 February 1970) is a Serbian politician. He served as the Minister of Defence of Serbia in the Government of Serbia from 2016 to 2017, and the Minister of Labour, Employment, Veteran and Social Policy  from 2017 to 2020.

Education and career
Đorđević graduated from the School of National Defense in Belgrade. He later acquired a joint-master's degree in international banking and finance from the John Naisbitt University Faculty of International Economics and the Panteion University. He currently completes his doctoral studies in the field of economic sciences at the University Business Academy in Novi Sad. He gained professional experience in leading positions in financial and executive management domestic and regional companies including Comtrade, Kabel-X and others.

Political career
From 2012, he served as the Deputy Minister of Defence of Serbia. He also serves as the president of the Political Council for Gender Equality of the Government of the Republic of Serbia and National Director of Arms. On 2 March 2016, he was appointed as the Minister of Defence of Serbia.

In February 2017, the Prime Minister of Serbia Aleksandar Vučić decided to run for the 2017 Serbian presidential elections. He won the elections in the first round and was sworn as the President of Serbia on 31 May 2017. Weeks later, he gave mandate to Ana Brnabić to form the governmental cabinet. On 29 June 2017, the cabinet of Ana Brnabić was formed, with Đorđević swapping minister positions with Aleksandar Vulin to become the Minister of Labour, Employment, Veteran and Social Policy. His term ended on 28 October 2020, when Darija Kisić Tepavčević was appointed as new minister.

Since 4 March 2021, Đorđević has been serving as director of the national postal service Pošta Srbije.

Personal life
He is married and has a son and daughter. He speaks English and Russian and is a member of Mensa Serbia.

References

External links

1970 births
Living people
Politicians from Belgrade
Government ministers of Serbia
Defence ministers of Serbia
Megatrend University alumni